The Popular Conservative Alliance ( - APC) is a right-wing conservative Nicaraguan political party. The APC split from the Democratic Conservative Party (PCD) in 1984 when Miriam Argüello led a group opposed to the PCD's position on whether to participate in elections.

In the 1990 elections the party won five seats as part of the National Opposition Union, and joined the government after the  UNO was elected. As of 2006, the APC and its leader, Miriam Argüello, were in alliance with the Sandinista National Liberation Front.

References

1989 establishments in Nicaragua
Conservative parties in Nicaragua
Political parties established in 1989
Political parties in Nicaragua